Thonhausen is a municipality in the district of Altenburger Land in Thuringia, Germany. It belongs to the Verwaltungsgemeinschaft of Oberes Sprottental.

Geography

Neighboring municipalities
Communities near Thonhausen are Jonaswalde, Heyersdorf, the City of Schmölln, and Vollmershain in the Landkreis Altenburger Land; as well as the City of Crimmitschau in the Saxon Landkreis of Zwickauer Land.

Municipal arrangement
Thonhausen has three districts:  Thonhausen, Schönhaide, and Wettelswalde.

Business and Infrastructure
Thonhausen is located at the Schmölln Interchange on Bundesautobahn 4.

References

Altenburger Land